Ebenezer St Mark Ntlali (born in Richmond, Northern Cape, 1954) is a South African Anglican bishop. He is the fourteenth and current Bishop of Grahamstown.

He trained for the priesthood at St Bede's College, Transkei, and has a bachelor's degree in church history and systematic theology from Rhodes University. He was archdeacon of King William's Town until his consecration as a bishop in 2007.

Notes and references 

 
 
 
 

 

 

 

1954 births
Living people
People from Ubuntu Local Municipality
Xhosa people
Anglican bishops of Grahamstown
Anglican archdeacons in Africa
21st-century Anglican Church of Southern Africa bishops
Rhodes University alumni